Seth Perkins Staples (Aug. 31, 1776- Nov. 6, 1861) was an American lawyer and politician.  He founded what became the New Haven Law School, which was absorbed by Yale University as their Yale Law School. He was the brother-in-law of Roger Sherman Jr.

He was son of Rev. John and Susanna (Perkins) Staples, and was born in Canterbury, Connecticut.  He graduated from Yale College in 1797.  After studying law for two years in the office of Judge Daggett, in New Haven, Connecticut, he was admitted to the bar in Litchfield, Connecticut, in Sept. 1799. He began to practice his profession in New Haven.

His legal attainments and his excellent library early drew around him a large number of students, and he soon found himself at the head of a flourishing private Law School. After toiling alone for several years, in 1820 he called to his aid Judge Samuel J. Hitchcock, and made him a partner both in his business and in his Law School. During this time he is known to have helped out future United States Attorney Asa Child. In 1846 the School thus originated, having meanwhile passed into other hands, was formally recognized by the Corporation of Yale College, as the Law Department of that Institution.

During his residence in New Haven, he was several times a Representative of the town, in the Legislature of Connecticut, but he withdrew wholly from public life in 1816.

In 1824 he removed from New Haven to  New York City, where he was wholly devoted to his profession till about 1856. His ability, industry and attainments made him a distinguished ornament of the bar.

He was married in Nov., 1799, to Catharine, only daughter of Rev S. Wales, Prof, of Divinity in Yale College. He had three sons and three daughters. He died in New York City, Nov. 6, 1861, aged 85.

References

External links

Litchfield Law School Seth Perkins Staples
Yale Art Gallery Seth Perkins Staples
Brief Memoirs of the Class of 1797
Letter from "A Philanthropist" to Seth Staples Theodore Sedgwick and Roger S. Baldwin

1776 births
1861 deaths
Yale University alumni
Yale Law School
Members of the Connecticut House of Representatives
Connecticut lawyers
New York (state) lawyers
19th-century American lawyers